Cranford House School is a co-educational private day school for boys and girls aged 3 to 18, in Moulsford, a village in South Oxfordshire near Wallingford, England. In September 2020, a Sixth Form was added and boys were admitted into Year 7 and Year 12 with a view to the school gradually becoming fully co-educational. Established in 1931 by a Moulsford resident, Miss Winifred E Laurence, the school now numbers around 500 pupils.

School history

1931 – 1939

Cranford House was founded in 1931 as a school for one pupil, six-year-old Boris Higgs. The school's founder, Winifred E Laurence, taught Higgs in her own home, Cranford House, a large Victorian mansion on the site of what is now Moulsford Preparatory School. Higgs was joined by other children, some of them much younger, and Laurence's old nursery became a schoolroom where a Miss Tollit taught "the babies". The school taught traditional values within a Church of England religious framework.

The school outgrew the three rooms in Cranford House and more purpose–built classrooms were added to the existing building. The curriculum was expanded, with lessons taken outdoors as much as possible. New activities were included, such as horse riding lessons, piano and percussion, carpentry for the boys, and school outings.  In 1937, the school produced its first play, A Market Square.

Second World War
During the Second World War, school life continued as usual with minor adaptations. Laurence opened the school during the summer holidays so that all children, including evacuees, could enjoy games, bathing and other activities. Due to the rationing of petrol, children were rowed up the river to school or used a pony and trap.

1945 – 1980

By 1950, when pupil numbers had reached 136, it was recognised that more space was required. Cranford House was renovated and a swimming pool was added. In 1953, the adjacent Moulsford House was acquired and some of the school moved across the road, becoming a dual site. Cranford House was granted official recognition following an inspection by the Department of Education and Science in 1955.

By 1961 the volume of traffic through Moulsford made crossing the road dangerous. As a result the school was re-located to its current site. A sister school to Cranford House was opened near Worthing in West Sussex the same year. Called Rustington House, it had the same uniform, syllabus and ethos as Cranford. At Cranford House a gymnasium was built in 1967 and new activities were introduced such as canoeing, rock-climbing and national show-jumping competitions at Hickstead.

In 1969 Laurence retired. Miss Shine became headmistress until her retirement in 1980. Shine left a school of over 300 pupils and her departure marked the establishment of a charitable trust under a Board of Governors.

1980 – To Present 

From 1992 the headmistress, Alison Gray, adopted a more modern curriculum, adding new extra-curricular activities. A new science block opened in 1985, The Barn was rebuilt in 1988, and additional tennis and netball courts were added in 1990. In recent times the school has developed its facilities to cope with the increase in pupil numbers and changes in the curriculum. A cover was added to the swimming pool, the third science block built, along with the Orangery dining room, the Atrium/Library, an all-weather astroturf pitch and a modern, well-equipped sports hall in 2014.

In 2016 Cranford House celebrated its 85th anniversary with a choral service at Dorchester Abbey and an alumni reunion.

2018 marked the opening of a newly revamped Junior School complete with new Junior Library and brand new classrooms.

2020 saw a major re-branding of Cranford House, which included the addition of an on-site Sixth Form and refurbished Creative and Performing Arts facilities. Furthermore, the school announced the move to a fully coeducational model which started in September 2020 with boys entering the Senior School in Year 7 and the Sixth Form in Year 12. This came alongside the enhancement of the Junior School and the installation of a new STEM Centre.

Inspections

The school was inspected in 2014 by the Independent Schools Inspectorate and rated Excellent in every category. It was inspected again in 2018 and met all standards.

References

External links
School Website
Profile on the ISC website
ISI Inspection Reports

Educational institutions established in 1931
Girls' schools in Oxfordshire
Private schools in Oxfordshire
Member schools of the Girls' Schools Association
1931 establishments in England